The Dakar Series is an annual series of rally raid off-road races, organised by the Amaury Sport Organisation. The series groups together events similar in style to the Dakar Rally and was founded in 2008 after the cancellation of the 2008 edition of the rally.

Rallies

2015:
 Desafio Ruta 40: 17-23 May
- moto winner: Paulo Gonçalves (Honda)
- auto winner: Orlando Terranova/Bernard Graue (Mini)
 Desafio Guarani: 19-25 July
- moto winner: Kevin Benavides (Honda)
- auto winner: Peter Jerie/Laurent Lichtleuchter (Toyota)
 Desafio Inca: 10-13 September
- cancelled

2016:
 Merzouga Rally: 21-27 May
- moto winner: Kevin Benavides (Honda)
- quad winner: Clemens Eicker (E-ATV)
- sxs winner: Frederic Henrichy/Eric Bersey (Polaris)

2017:
 Merzouga Rally: 7-12 May
- moto winner: Xavier de Soultrait (Yamaha)
- quad winner: Nicolas Cavigliasso (Yamaha)
- sxs winner: Frederic Henrichy/Eric Bersey (Polaris)

2018:
 Merzouga Rally: 15-20 April
- moto winner: Joan Barreda (Honda)
- quad winner: Axel Dutrie (Yamaha)
- sxs winner: Bruno Varela/Gustavo Gugelmin (Can-Am)

2019:
 Merzouga Rally: 31 March-05 April
- moto winner: Adrien van Beveren (Yamaha)
- quad winner: Axel Dutrie (Yamaha)
- sxs winner: Nasser Al-Attiyah/Matthieu Baumel (Can-Am)

References

Dakar Rally
Truck racing series
Motorcycle racing series